Alvin Elchico (born January 30, 1974) is a Filipino field reporter, newscaster and television host working for ABS-CBN and DZMM. A business reporter early in his career, he was the sole journalist able to report from inside the Oakwood Premier building during the Oakwood mutiny in July 2003. He is currently a co-host of ABS-CBN's evening news program TV Patrol Weekend.

Education
Elchico graduated with a Bachelor of Arts in mass communication from University of St. La Salle in Bacolod City.

Career
Elchico started his career as a news anchor and field reporter for TV Patrol Bacolod as TV Patrol Western Visayas from 1996 to 2000. In 2000, he transferred to Manila and first became a news writer at ABS-CBN's DZMM; then in 2002, he became a newsbreak (now News Patrol) anchor and eventually a field reporter. Despite being originally assigned to cover business-related news, Elchico was forced to cover the Oakwood mutiny on July 27, 2003, when he was the only journalist in the Oakwood Premier building who could cover the event in detail.

Since November 26, 2011, he anchors TV Patrol Weekend. His co-anchor was Pinky Webb, until 2015, when she was replaced by Zen Hernandez. He is also the senior business reporter of ABS-CBN. A former narrator in TV Patrol and Bandila, he still narrates on Bandila vignettes. He also takes on anchoring duties for the main TV Patrol weekday newscast when any of its anchors is absent Since October 2018.

At DZMM and its television counterpart, TeleRadyo, he anchored Konsyumer ATBP. (now replaced by Bida Konsyumer, this time with Elchico being solo) alongside Department of Trade and Industry (Philippines) Usec. Ruth Castelo, Lakas ng Siyensya with Dr. Maria Josefina Arilay and SRO or Suhestiyon, Reaksyon at Opinyon with Doris Bigornia.

From July 23, 2011, until May 3, 2020, he is one of the hosts of the weekend medical morning program Salamat Dok together with Bernadette Sembrano.

Awards and citations
2012 Best Public Service Program Host: Salamat Dok! (along with Bernadette Sembrano) – 6th UPLB Gandingan Isko't Iska's Broadcast Choice Awards

References

External links
ABS-CBN News and Current Affairs Group

1974 births
Living people
Filipino television news anchors
Filipino radio journalists
People from Bacolod
University of St. La Salle alumni
ABS-CBN personalities
ABS-CBN News and Current Affairs people
Visayan people